Cattle Creek is a rural locality in the North Burnett Region, Queensland, Australia. In the  Cattle Creek had a population of 28 people.

History 
O'Bill Bill Creek State School opened in January 1916. In 1925 it was renamed Cattle Creek Valley State School. It closed on 12 March 1971. It was on the north side of Cattle Creek School Road (approx ).

In the  Cattle Creek had a population of 28 people.

References 

North Burnett Region
Localities in Queensland